Knightmare is a British television programme for children and was broadcast on CITV from 1987 to 1994.

Knightmare may also refer to:

Knightmare: Majou Densetsu, a video game released for the MSX in 1986
The Maze of Galious: Knightmare II, a video game released for the MSX in 1987
Shalom: Knightmare III, a video game released for the MSX in 1987
Knightmare (1987 video game), based on the television programme
Knightmare (1991 video game), based on the television programme
Knightmare (roller coaster), a defunct roller coaster in the United Kingdom
A dystopian potential future witnessed in the DC Extended Universe films Batman v Superman: Dawn of Justice and Zack Snyder's Justice League

See also
Knight (disambiguation)
Nightmare (disambiguation)
Knightmare Chess, a commercial chess variant
Knightmare Frame, mechas in the anime television series Code Geass
Knightmare Tower, a 2013 video game